The Elizabeth Apartments on Second Ave. NW in Jamestown, North Dakota were built in 1921.  The building was listed on the National Register of Historic Places in 1986.

According to its NRHP nomination, the building was deemed significant "for its association with the business lives of the John H. Canhams and Ormsby McHargs, leading developers and owners of Jamestown's utility companies from 1888 to 1924" and also "architecturally and historically as the best example in the city of affordable multi-family housing constructed in response to the population boom in Jamestown between 1910 and 1920 when housing was scarce, Post-World War I labor costs were high, and there was a severe shortage of building materials."

The design was simple and extensively used stucco, which "directly related to the need for quick construction and the lack of good building materials, including brick, in the early 1920s."

References

Residential buildings on the National Register of Historic Places in North Dakota
Neoclassical architecture in North Dakota
Residential buildings completed in 1921
Buildings and structures in Jamestown, North Dakota
National Register of Historic Places in Stutsman County, North Dakota
1921 establishments in North Dakota
Apartment buildings in North Dakota